Māori Indians (or Indo-Māori) are an ethnic group in New Zealand of people with mixed Māori and Indian ancestry.

History 
The earliest record of a mixed Indo-Māori union is said to have occurred in 1810, when an Indian man from Bengal abandoned a shipping vessel to marry a Māori woman. There is also record of an Indian man living with his Māori wife in the Bay of Islands in 1815; another took up residence on Stewart Island after 1814.

Possibly the earliest non-Māori settlers of the Otago region of South Island were three Indian lascars who deserted ship to live among the Māori in 1813. There, they assisted the Ngāi Tahu by passing on new skills and technologies, including how to attack colonial European vessels in the rain when their guns could not be fired. They integrated into Māori culture completely, participating in Tā moko and taking on Māori names.

The late 1800s and early 1900s saw the first wave of migration of Indian men and later women arriving to the country. A number of them came directly to New Zealand but some came via Fiji and others via other British colonies such as Burma. In the earliest group of Indian pioneer men were those who came to New Zealand as teenagers. These young men from Punjab and Gujarat were generally looked after by the Māori community, and tended to have unions with Māori women. Children of these unions were often cast out by the wider Indian community. However, such children continued to be welcomed into the Māori community.

Of the 3,151 Indians recorded on the 1951 census of New Zealand - 253 were of Māori Indian origin. In 10 years, by the 1961 census, there were just slightly more Indians in New Zealand, while the number of Māori Indians had risen dramatically to 454.

In Te Arawa the most well-known whānau of Indo-Māori descent are the Bhana whānau from Ngāti Whakaue. Another notable family are the children of Bruce Stewart, who are half Indo-Fijian through their mother and grew up at Tapu Te Ranga Marae.

21st century 
Responses to the 2001 New Zealand census indicated that 1.5% of Indian women and 2% of Indian men in New Zealand were in inter-ethnic unions with a Māori partner. About 18% of children of these unions can converse in the Māori language, while less than 10% could speak an Indian language.

The first hui (Māori assembly) for people of mixed Māori and Indian descent was held in 2012 in Rotorua. A second assembly was held in 2014, with over 200 mixed Māori Indians in attendance.

References 

Demographics of New Zealand
Māori
Indian diaspora in New Zealand
Ethnic groups in New Zealand
New Zealand people of Indian descent